The 2007 ISSF World Shotgun Championships were held in Nicosia, Cyprus, from September 3 to September 9, 2007.

Medal count

Results

External links 
 ISSF TV (Full results)

ISSF World Shooting Championships
World Shotgun Championships
Sport in Nicosia
International sports competitions hosted by Cyprus
21st century in Nicosia
2007 in Cypriot sport